Mildbraedia is a plant genus of the family Euphorbiaceae first described as a genus in 1909. The entire genus is native to Africa.

Species
 Mildbraedia carpinifolia – Kenya, Tanzania, Mozambique
 Mildbraedia klaineana – Republic of the Congo, Democratic Republic of the Congo, Cabinda, Gabon
 Mildbraedia paniculata – Democratic Republic of the Congo, Gabon, Ghana, Ivory Coast, Liberia

formerly included
moved to Croton
Mildbraedia balboana - Croton alienus

References

Crotoneae
Euphorbiaceae genera
Flora of Africa